Chow Tsz Ki (born in Hong Kong) is a fencer from Hong Kong who won two bronze medals at the 2006 Asian Games in the women's sabre individual and team competitions. Her coach, Andras Decsi, is from Hungary and once worked with the Hong Kong Sabre Fencing Team.  She also competed at the 2004 and 2008 Olympic Games. Chow is the most decorated female fencer from Hong Kong in the Asian Championships with 3 silver and 6 bronze medals, including two individual medals.

References

Living people
Hong Kong female sabre fencers
Fencers at the 2004 Summer Olympics
Fencers at the 2008 Summer Olympics
Olympic fencers of Hong Kong
Asian Games medalists in fencing
Fencers at the 2002 Asian Games
Fencers at the 2006 Asian Games
Asian Games bronze medalists for Hong Kong
Medalists at the 2006 Asian Games
1982 births